The Galway-Kildare rivalry is a Gaelic football rivalry between Irish county teams Galway and Kildare, who first played each other in 1919. The fixture has been an infrequent one in the history of the championship, however, the rivalry intensified during a series of championship encounters between 1998 and 2000. Galway's home ground is Pearse Stadium and Kildare's home ground is St. Conleth's Park, however, all of their championship meetings have been held at neutral venues, usually Croke Park.

While Galway have the highest number of Connacht titles and have the third most All Ireland titles. Kildare lie in third position behind Dublin and Meath on the roll of honour in Leinster, they have also enjoyed success in the All-Ireland Senior Football Championship, having won 13 championship titles between them to date. Galway beat Kildare in the 1998 All Ireland Final, and the 2000 All Ireland Semi Final, the two biggest meetings of the counties to date in modern times.

All-time results

Legend

Senior

References

Kildare
Kildare county football team rivalries